Fenethazine (INN) (brand names Anergen, Contralergial, Ethysine, Etisine, Lisergan, Lysergan; former developmental code names RP-3015, SC-1627, WY-1143), or phenethazine, is a first-generation antihistamine of the phenothiazine group. Promethazine, and subsequently chlorpromazine, were derived from fenethazine. Fenethazine, in turn, was derived from phenbenzamine.

References

Antihistamines
Phenothiazines